"All on Me" is a song co-written and recorded by American country music singer Devin Dawson. It is his debut single, and it appears on his first album, Dark Horse. Dawson wrote the song with his twin brother Jacob Durrett and Austin Smith, and Jay Joyce produced it.

Critical reception
Billy Dukes of the blog Taste of Country reviewed the song favorably, stating that "There's nothing demanding about the mid-tempo love song, which is why it's endearing."

Commercial performance
The song peaked at No. 2 on Billboards Country Airplay on March 31, 2018. It has sold 223,000 copies in the United States since April 2018.

Music video
The song's music video premiered in July 2017. It was filmed at the abandoned Tennessee State Prison. Justin Clough directed the video.

Charts

Weekly charts

Year-end charts

Certifications

References

2017 songs
2017 debut singles
Devin Dawson songs
Song recordings produced by Jay Joyce
Warner Records Nashville singles
Songs written by Devin Dawson